Aeroflot Flight L-51 was a scheduled domestic passenger flight operated by an Antonov An-24 that crashed on approach to Liepāja International Airport on 30 December 1967, resulting in the death of 43 of the 51 people on board. To date, it is the deadliest aviation accident in Latvian history. The investigation revealed the cause of the accident to be pilot error.

Accident
Flight L-51 was a scheduled passenger flight from Riga to Liepaja. On approach to Liepāja International Airport the airliner entered the glide slope at a speed of 300 km/h and an altitude of 300 meters instead of the recommended 220 km/h at 200 meters. The aircrew elected to use reverse thrust to slow the too fast and high Antonov for landing but then declared a missed approach and attempted to go around. The crew increased the thrust of both engines and retracted the flaps and landing gear. The right engine began delivering forward thrust but the left engine was still in reverse thrust. The aircraft entered a roll to the left with rapidly decreasing altitude and struck the ground at a pitch angle of 0 degrees 250 meters left of the approach path in a snow-covered field. Because the landing gear was retracted the lower fuselage then left propeller contacted the ground before and aircraft gained altitude and became airborne again, the left propeller vibrating severely. The airliner covered 140 meters then struck a telephone pole severing 3 meters of the right wing along with part of its aileron. The aircraft yawed right and continued flying for 1,270 meters with an increasing bank angle to the right until it struck the ground heavily at a bank angle of 48 degrees. There was no fire at the crash scene, but the Antonov was completely destroyed.

Aircraft
The aircraft involved was an Antonov An-24B, serial number 67302909  and registered as CCCP-46215 to Aeroflot. The construction of the airliner was completed on 30 November 1966 and had sustained a total of 1,934 flight hours before the crash.

Investigation
After a detailed examination of the accident, investigators reported the chain of events leading to the crash. The flight entered the glide slope with excess speed and too high. The crew's improper use of reverse thrust in flight and their inability to take the left engine out of beta thrust mode in a timely manner. The premature retraction of the flaps and landing gear during the go around attempt was a contributing factor in the crash.

See also
Aeroflot accidents and incidents
Aeroflot accidents and incidents in the 1960s

References

Accidents and incidents involving the Antonov An-24
Aviation accidents and incidents in 1967
Aviation accidents and incidents in the Soviet Union
L-51
1967 in the Soviet Union
Airliner accidents and incidents caused by pilot error